This is a list of settlements in the Dodecanese islands, Greece. It is grouped by regional unit.

Kalymnos (regional unit)

Agathonisi 
Astypalaia
Kalymnos
Leipsoi 
Leros
Patmos

Karpathos (regional unit)

 Aperi
 Arkasa
 Karpathos
 Kasos
 Menetes
 Mesochori
 Olympos
 Othos
 Pyles
 Stoa, Karpathos|Stoa
 Volada

Kos (regional unit)

 Antimacheia
 Asfendiou
 Mastixari
 Kardamaina
 Kefalos
 Kos
 Tigaki
 Marmari
 Pyli

Rhodes (regional unit)

 Afantou
 Agios Isidoros
 Apolakkia
 Apollona
 Archangelos
 Archipoli
 Arnitha
 Asklipieio, Rhodes
 Chalki
 Damatria
 Dimylia
 Emponas
 Fanes
 Gennadi
 Ialysos
 Istrios
 Kalathos, Rhodes
 Kalavarda
 Kalythies
 Kastellorizo
 Kattavia
 Koskinou
 Kremasti
 Kritinia
 Lachania
 Laerma
 Lardos
 Lindos
 Livadia, Tilos
 Malonas
 Maritsa
 Masari, Rhodes
 Megalo Chorio, Tilos
 Mesanagros
 Monolithos
 Paradeisi
 Pastida
 Platania, Rhodes
 Profilia
 Psinthos
 Pylonas
 Rhodes (city)
 Salakos
 Siana, Rhodes
 Soroni
 Symi
 Theologos
 Vati (Rhodes)

See also
List of towns and villages in Greece

Dodecanese
Dodecanese